Telangana State Guesthouse formerly Chief Minister's Camp Office is a state guest house of the State Government of Telangana, India.  The camp office is converted to Office of the Inspector General (security). The building is now part of Pragathi Bhavan, the official residence of the Chief Minister of Telangana. It is located in Greenlands circle, Begumpet.

History
It was formerly the official residence of the Chief Minister of Telangana and before bifurcation the official residence of Chief Minister of Andhra Pradesh (United). The camp office was built in 2004 after the Congress party came into power as the official residence of the Chief Minister of Andhra Pradesh. The first Chief Minister to move in was Y. S. Rajasekhara Reddy in 2005 and stayed in it for five years, until his death in 2009.

The Camp Office
The CM Camp Office has office and residence on the two-storied premises. It has roads on both east and north directions. It was built as per Vaastu principles.

A theater was built on the premises in 2007 at a cost of ₹1.15 crore,  and has state of the art recording and online editing equipment.

Chief Ministers in residence
 Y. S. Rajasekhara Reddy - 2005 - 2009
 Konijeti Rosiah after sworn in as Chief Minister, never resided but used as office
Nallari Kiran Kumar Reddy - 2010 - 2014.
Kalvakuntla Chandrashekar Rao - June 2014 - November 2016

Post bifurcation
Following the creation of the state of Telangana, the Camp Office became the residence of the Chief Minister of Telangana, with the Chief Minister of the residual Andhra Pradesh taking up residence at the Lakeview Guest House.

 K Chandrashekhar Rao - 22 June 2014 - 2015

Present
Presently it is used as a guest house by the Chief Minister of Telangana.

See also
 Pragathi Bhavan

References

Government of Telangana
Buildings and structures completed in 2005
Buildings and structures in Hyderabad, India
Chief Ministers of Telangana
Chief Ministers of Andhra Pradesh
State guesthouses
Government buildings in Telangana